Saldiha College, established in 1966, is the general degree college in Saldiha, Chhatna Block, Bankura district. It offers undergraduate courses in arts, commerce and sciences. It is affiliated to  Bankura University.

Departments

Science
Chemistry
Physics
Mathematics
Zoology
Botany (General)
Physiology (General)

Arts and Commerce
Bengali
English
Sanskrit
History
Political Science
Economics
Santali (General)
Commerce

Accreditation
Recently, Saldiha College has been re-accredited and awarded B+ grade by the National Assessment and Accreditation Council (NAAC). The college is also recognized by the University Grants Commission (UGC).

See also

References

External links
Saldiha College

Colleges affiliated to Bankura University
Educational institutions established in 1966
Universities and colleges in Bankura district
1966 establishments in West Bengal